Gonubie is a town in the Eastern Cape province of South Africa.

Seaside town at the mouth of the Gqunube (Gonubie) River, 21 km north-east of East London. The name is said to be derived from Khoekhoen and to mean 'bramble river', after Royena growing there.

About Gonubie
Gonubie has about 11,500 residents, who reside in the lower income area of Mzamomhle, the middle income area of Riegerton Park, and the majority of the residents residing in the middle to upper income bracket avenues and streets. Gonubie has 18 avenues and 12 streets.  There is also the lavish riverside area, which is a popular tourist destination. Gonubie main beach is a beautiful sandy beach with a boardwalk of international standard. In 2010/11 Gonubie Beach was awarded the prestigious Blue Flag beach award. The river serves as a great place for activities such as canoeing and kayaking.

References

Populated places in Buffalo City Metropolitan Municipality